Lake Iroquois can refer to:

Lake Iroquois (South Dakota)
Lake Iroquois (Vermont) in Vermont in the United States
Lake Iroquois, Illinois in Iroquois County in Illinois in the United States
Glacial Lake Iroquois, a prehistoric lake in the bed of present-day Lake Ontario in North America.